Pointed Stick Cone is a cinder cone in east-central British Columbia, Canada, located in Wells Gray Provincial Park.

See also
 List of volcanoes in Canada
 Volcanism of Canada
 Volcanism of Western Canada

References

Cinder cones of British Columbia
Holocene volcanoes
Monogenetic volcanoes
One-thousanders of British Columbia